Dipsas georgejetti, George Jett's snail-eater, is a non-venomous snake found in Ecuador.

References

Dipsas
Snakes of South America
Reptiles of Ecuador
Endemic fauna of Ecuador
Reptiles described in 2018